Stanley Lewis Williamson (February 19, 1909 – August 17, 1965) was an American football player and coach and college athletic administrator. He served as the head football coach at Oklahoma City University in 1934 and at Santa Barbara College of the University of California—now known as the University of California, Santa Barbara—from 1941 to 1948 and again from 1952 to 1955, compiling a career college football coaching record of 33–46–3. Williamson was also the athletic director at UC Santa Barbara from 1962 until 1965. He attended University of Southern California, where he played college football as a center for the USC Trojans and was the captain of Howard Jones's national championship-winning 1931 USC Trojans football team. Williamson died on August 17, 1965, at St. Francis Hospital in Santa Barbara, California, from a malignant brain tumor.

Head coaching record

College

References

1909 births
1965 deaths
American football centers
Kansas State Wildcats football coaches
Oklahoma City Chiefs football coaches
Oklahoma Sooners football coaches
UC Santa Barbara Gauchos athletic directors
UC Santa Barbara Gauchos football coaches
USC Trojans football players
High school football coaches in Oklahoma
People from Pittsburg, California
Coaches of American football from California
Players of American football from California
Sportspeople from the San Francisco Bay Area
Deaths from brain cancer in the United States